Fazle Elahi Akbar (born 6 November 1957) is a former major general of Bangladesh Army who served as military adviser to the UN Advance Mission in the Sudan (UNAMIS). He served as the Force Commander in UNMIS from 2004 to 2006.

Career

In Bangladesh Army 
Akbar's first UN peacekeeping assignment was as part of the United Nations Iran–Iraq Military Observer Group (UNIIMOG) from 1988 to 1989.

After military 

Akbar is a director of Social Islami Bank Limited. He retired from the Bangladesh Army in 2006. On 21 October 2008, he joined as the head of personal security of Khaleda Zia, former Prime Minister of Bangladesh.

References 

Living people
Bangladesh Army generals
United Nations military personnel
National University, Bangladesh alumni
Bangladeshi generals
1957 births